William Thomas Walls (December 8, 1912January 3, 1993) was a professional American football end in the National Football League. He played six seasons for the New York Giants (1937–39, 1941–43).

1914 births
1993 deaths
People from Lonoke, Arkansas
Players of American football from Arkansas
American football wide receivers
TCU Horned Frogs football players
New York Giants players